Danvers or D'Anvers (French: from Antwerp) is a surname. Notable people with the surname include:

Alicia D'Anvers (1668–1725), British poet
Charles Danvers (songwriter) (f. 1950s), French-born US songwriter
Dennis Danvers (born 1947), US author
Gérard Thibault d'Anvers (1574–1629), Dutch fencing master
Henry Danvers, 1st Earl of Danby (1573–1644), British soldier
Ivor Danvers (born 1932), British actor
John Danvers (1588–1655), British politician and courtier
Tasha Danvers (born 1977), British track and field athlete
William Danvers (1428–1504), British justice

Fictional characters
Mrs. Danvers, character in the novel Rebecca by Daphne du Maurier
Alex Danvers, original character of the TV Show, Supergirl
Caleb Danvers, fictional character in the 2006 film The Covenant
Carol Danvers, Marvel comic book character, also known as Ms. Marvel, Captain Marvel, Binary, and Warbird
Ed Danvers, fictional state prosecutor played by Željko Ivanek on the U.S. TV series Homicide: Life on the Street
Kara Danvers, another version of Supergirl
Linda Danvers, one version of Supergirl
Clayton and Jeremy Danvers, characters in the TV series Bitten played by Greyston Holt and Greg Bryk, respectively

See also
Bob Danvers-Walker (1906–1990), British radio personality